Samanabad railway station is located in Samanabad area in Faisalabad city, Faisalabad district of Punjab province of the Pakistan.

The station serves the areas of Samanabad, D type, Nisar colony and Novelty in Faisalabad city. Famous Government Science College Faisalabad lies in front of Samanabad Railway station.

See also
 List of railway stations in Pakistan
 Pakistan Railways

References

External links

Railway stations in Faisalabad District
Railway stations on Khanewal–Wazirabad Line